Belmont Mound State Park is a state park of Wisconsin, United States, containing Belmont Mound, a  hill. The park is managed by the Belmont Lions Club rather than the Wisconsin Department of Natural Resources.  Belmont Mound is an outlier of the Niagara Escarpment, one of several in this part of the unglaciated Driftless Area. "Belmont" derives from the French for "beautiful mountain." 

A portion of the park received further protection in 1981 when Belmont Mound Woods State Natural Area was added to the Wisconsin State Natural Areas Program.  The park is for day-use only; there are picnic facilities but no campground.  The observation tower was closed in 2019 by the Wisconsin Department of Natural Resources due to three suicides and misuse of the tower a decade earlier. In the Fall of 2021, the removal of the observation tower was completed.   The First Capitol Historic Site, where the first session of the Wisconsin Territory Legislature met beginning on October 25, 1836, is located just west of the park entrance.

References

External links

 Belmont Mound Woods State Natural Area

Driftless Area
IUCN Category III
Lions Clubs International
Niagara Escarpment
Protected areas established in 1961
Protected areas of Lafayette County, Wisconsin
State Natural Areas of Wisconsin
State parks of Wisconsin
1961 establishments in Wisconsin